VIjay Dev (died April 11, 2019) was a professor and principal in SP College, Pune in India. He was a writer, teacher, professor of political science and a speaker.

Career
Dev was the principal of SP college, Pune from 2000 to 2002. He was also member of Tilak Maharashtra Vidyapeeth (TMV) as well as Savitribai Phule Pune University (SPPU)’s political study circle. He had doctorate and had presented several papers in various national seminars and also conducted workshops on socio-political subjects like national politics and democracy. Sajyadri and history were his recent topics of interest.

He was very popular with the students of college and was very respectable personality in political science.

Dev was founder member and president of the Durgapremi mandal. This organisation was dedicated for forts.

Books written
  - 
  -  
  - 
  - 
  - 
  - 
  - 
  - 
  - 
  - 
  - 
  - 
  - 
  -

Death
Dev died on April 11, 2019 due to a heart attack. He was 78 years old. He is survived by his wife Veena Dev, an author, and two daughters, Mrinal Kulkarni, actor and Madhura Dev. Vijay Dev was son-in-law of well-known Marathi author G. N. Dandekar.

References

2019 deaths
Year of birth missing
Indian educators